43 North is an accelerator program, founded by Empire State Development and the State of New York, that hosts an annual startup competition, investing $5 million per year to attract and cultivate high-growth companies in Buffalo, NY. 43North portfolio companies also receive free incubator space in Buffalo for one year, guidance from mentors in related fields, and access to other business incentive programs such as START-UP NY. To date, 43North has invested $35 million in 59 companies, created over 1,000 jobs in the Western New York region - nearly 3,000 globally, and has a portfolio valuation of over $4 billion. 43North's portfolio has gained traction in recent years including notable growth by ACV Auctions who achieved "unicorn" status in 2019 and went public, listing on Nasdaq in March 2021; Squire who closed a series C in 2020 at a $250 million valuation, and Circuit Clinical whose latest raise was supported by LabCorp. 43North operates through the support of Governor Kathy Hochul, Empire State Development, the Ralph C. Wilson, Jr. Foundation, and several other sponsors.

Program 
In its main program, 43North runs an annual competition that results in awarding $5 million to a group of eight companies, including a $1 million investment as the top award. The application period to apply occurs every spring and lasts approximately two months. They accept applications from entrepreneurs all over the world ages 18 years and older, and are open to multiple industry sectors. Interested applicants apply online by filling out an online application.

The competition has 3 rounds of judging: an online written application, a live video pitch, and an annual pitch event for the final 20 companies in October at Shea's Performing Arts Center.

One first-place winner receives an equity investment of $1 million, the runner-up receives an equity investment of $650,000, the third-place winner wins an equity investment of $550,000, and the five other winning teams are awarded equity investments of $500,000. All winners receive workspace in 43North's business incubator located on the Buffalo Niagara Medical Campus, tax incentives through the state of New York, guidance from mentors and leaders in their field, media coverage, and connections in exchange for 5% equity.

Portfolio Companies 
As of 2021, 43North had invested a total of $30 million in 51 companies from the life sciences, software, manufacturing, clean tech, and consumer products industries. Its 2015 $1 million grand prize winner, ACV Auctions, whose app allows dealers to instantly buy and sell wholesale inventory, has raised more than $300 million since winning the competition and is Buffalo's first tech unicorn. The most recent Series D funding round raised $93 million in December 2018 that followed an earlier 2017 venture funding raise that had totaled $15 million, and was led by Bessemer Venture Partners, a $4 billion venture capital firm. This Series B funding builds on the $5 million in venture capital that ACV Auctions secured in 2016; that Series A round was led by Tribeca Venture Partners, with participation from SoftBank Capital NY (SBNY), Armory Square Ventures and Rand Capital (Nasdaq: RAND).

Finals Judges 
43North has used judges help determine the winners since its inception. Notable judges include:
 Tim Draper
 Gary Vaynerchuk
 Michael Lazerow
 Ambarish Mitra
 Esther Dyson
American broadcast news correspondent Luke Russert served as the 43North Finals Emcee in 2016, and Megan Smith, the 3rd Chief Technology Officer of the United States (U.S. CTO) and Assistant to the President, serving under President Barack Obama, served as the keynote speaker.

References

External links 
 

Financial services companies established in 2014
Companies based in Buffalo, New York
American companies established in 2014
Venture capital firms of the United States
Business incubators of the United States
Startup accelerators
2014 establishments in New York (state)